Ludwig Oswald Wenckebach (16 June 1895, in Heerlen – 3 November 1962, in Noordwijkerhout) was a Dutch sculptor, painter, and medallist. He was the son of the anatomist Karel Frederik Wenckebach and nephew and pupil of the graphic designer and painter Willem Wenckebach. He started as a painter, but in 1920 switched to sculpting. He is best known for his many war monuments and designing the coins issued in the Netherlands between 1948 and 1980.

External sources
Oswald Wenckebach at the Netherlands Institute for Art History.

Dutch currency designers
Dutch medallists
1895 births
1962 deaths
Dutch male painters
Dutch male sculptors
People from Heerlen
20th-century Dutch artists
20th-century Dutch sculptors
20th-century Dutch painters
20th-century Dutch male artists